Falcaustra is a genus of nematodes belonging to the family Kathlaniidae.

The genus has almost cosmopolitan distribution.

Species:

Falcaustra annandalei 
Falcaustra ararath 
Falcaustra armenica 
Falcaustra barbi 
Falcaustra belemensis 
Falcaustra bengalensis 
Falcaustra brevicaudata 
Falcaustra chauhani 
Falcaustra chiloscyllii 
Falcaustra condorcanquii 
Falcaustra desilvai 
Falcaustra donanaensis 
Falcaustra dubia 
Falcaustra duyagi 
Falcaustra falcata 
Falcaustra fernandoi 
Falcaustra greineri 
Falcaustra heosemydis 
Falcaustra kalasiensis 
Falcaustra kaverii 
Falcaustra kempi 
Falcaustra khadrai 
Falcaustra kinsellai 
Falcaustra kutcheri 
Falcaustra leptocephala 
Falcaustra leptodactyla
Falcaustra malaysiaia 
Falcaustra manouriacola 
Falcaustra mascula 
Falcaustra mirandafroesi 
Falcaustra nilgiriensis 
Falcaustra onama 
Falcaustra pahangi 
Falcaustra pillaii 
Falcaustra piscicola 
Falcaustra purchoni 
Falcaustra purvisi 
Falcaustra rangoonica 
Falcaustra roberti 
Falcaustra samarensis 
Falcaustra sanjuanensis 
Falcaustra siamensis 
Falcaustra similis 
Falcaustra stewarti 
Falcaustra stromateii 
Falcaustra tannaensis 
Falcaustra tchadi 
Falcaustra testudinis 
Falcaustra tintlwini 
Falcaustra trilokiae

References

Nematodes